The Peter P. Post House is an historic home in Woodcliff Lake, in Bergen County, New Jersey, United States. The house was built in the 18th century, and was added to the National Register of Historic Places on January 10, 1983. The Peter P. Post House was added to the register as an example of one of the early stone houses in Bergen County.

See also
National Register of Historic Places listings in Bergen County, New Jersey

References

Houses completed in the 18th century
Houses in Bergen County, New Jersey
Houses on the National Register of Historic Places in New Jersey
Woodcliff Lake, New Jersey
New Jersey Register of Historic Places